Suzanne Valadon (23 September 18657 April 1938) was a French painter who was born Marie-Clémentine Valadon at Bessines-sur-Gartempe, Haute-Vienne, France. In 1894, Valadon became the first woman painter admitted to the Société Nationale des Beaux-Arts. She was also the mother of painter Maurice Utrillo.

Valadon spent nearly 40 years of her life as an artist. The subjects of her drawings and paintings, such as Joy of Life (1911), included mostly female nudes, portraits of women, still lifes, and landscapes. She never attended the academy and was never confined within a set tradition or style of art. Despite not being confined to any tradition, she shocked the artistic world by painting male nudes as well as less idealized images of women in comparison to those of her male counterparts.

She was a model for many renowned artists. Among them, Valadon appeared in such paintings as Dance at Bougival (1883) and Dance in the City by Pierre-Auguste Renoir (1883), and Suzanne Valadon (1885) and The Hangover (Suzanne Valadon) (1887 - 1889) by Henri de Toulouse-Lautrec.

Early life 

Valadon grew up in poverty with her mother, an unmarried laundress in Montmartre. She did not know her father. Known to be quite independent and rebellious, she attended primary school until age eleven when she began working.

She had a series of jobs that included working in a milliner's workshop, at a factory making funeral wreaths, selling vegetables, and as a waitress. At the age of 15, she obtained a job in her most desired field: performing in the circus as an acrobat. She was able to work at the circus because of her connection with Count Antoine de La Rochefoucauld and Thèo Wagner, two symbolist painters, who were involved in decorating a circus belonging to Medrano. The circus was visited frequently by artists such as Toulouse-Lautrec and Berthe Morisot and it is speculated that this was the inspiration for a painting of Valadon by Morisot. A fall from a trapeze that injured her back is what ultimately ended her circus career after one year.

It is commonly believed that Valadon taught herself how to draw at the age of nine. In the Montmartre quarter of Paris, she pursued her interest in art, first working as a model and a muse for artists, observing and learning their techniques, as she could not afford art lessons herself. She observed and learned from artists, such as  Pierre Puvis de Chavannes, Henri de Toulouse-Lautrec, and Pierre-Auguste Renoir, before becoming a noted and successful painter in her own right.

Model

Valadon began working as a model in 1880 in Montmartre at age 15. She modeled for more than ten years for many different artists including Berthe Morisot, Pierre-Cécile Puvis de Chavannes, Théophile Steinlen, Pierre-Auguste Renoir, Jean-Jacques Henner, and Henri de Toulouse-Lautrec. She modeled under the name "Maria" before being nicknamed "Suzanne" by Toulouse-Lautrec, after the biblical story of Susanna and the Elders as he felt that she especially preferred modeling for older artists. She was Toulouse-Lautrec's lover for two years, which ended when she attempted suicide in 1888.

Valadon learned and furthered her art by observing the techniques of the artists for whom she posed. She was considered a very focused, ambitious, rebellious, determined, self-confident, and passionate woman. In the early 1890s, she befriended Edgar Degas, who was impressed by her bold line drawings and fine paintings. He purchased her work and encouraged her. She remained one of his closest friends until his death in 1917. Art historian Heather Dawkins believed that Valadon's experience as a model added depth to her own images of nude women, which tended to be less idealized than the representations of women by the male post-impressionists.

Morisot's 1880 drawing of Valadon as a tightrope walker preceded it, but the most recognizable early image of Valadon is in Renoir's Dance at Bougival from 1883, the same year that she posed for Dance in the City. In 1885, Renoir painted her portrait again as Girl Braiding Her Hair. Another of his portraits of her in 1885, Suzanne Valadon, is of her head and shoulders in profile. Valadon frequented the bars and taverns of Paris with her fellow painters and she was Toulouse-Lautrec's subject in his oil painting The Hangover.

Artist

Valadon was an acclaimed painter of her time, well-respected and championed by contemporaries such as Edgar Degas and Pierre-Auguste Renoir. She was admitted to professional associations and her works were admitted to juried exhibitions. She lived a bohemian life with rebellious vision.

Valadon's earliest surviving signed and dated work is a self-portrait from 1883, drawn in charcoal and pastel. She produced mostly drawings between 1883 and 1893, and began painting in 1892. Her first models were family members, especially her son, mother, and niece. 

Valadon began painting full-time in 1896. She painted still lifes, portraits, flowers, and landscapes that are noted for their strong composition and vibrant colors. She was, however, best known for her candid female nudes. Her work attracted attention partly because, by painting unidealized nudes, she upset the social norms of the time that were created by male artists.

Her earliest known female nude was executed in 1892. In 1895, the art dealer Paul Durand-Ruel exhibited a group of twelve etchings by Valadon that show women in various stages of their toilettes. Later, she regularly showed at Galerie Bernheim-Jeune in Paris. Valadon was first accepted as an exhibitor in the Salon de la Nationale in 1894 which is notable since competition for acceptance was fierce.  

She exhibited in the Salon d'Automne from 1909, in the Salon des Independants from 1911, and in the Salon des Femmes Artistes Modernes during 1933-1938. Notably, Degas was the first person to purchase drawings from her, and he introduced her to other collectors, including Paul Durand-Ruel and Ambroise Vollard. Degas also taught her the skill of soft-ground etching.

After her marriage to the well-to-do banker Paul Mousis, in 1896 Valadon became a full-time painter. She made a shift from drawing to painting in 1909. Her first large oils for the Salon related to sexual pleasures and they were some of the first examples in modern painting with a man being an object of desire by a woman similar to that idealized treatment of women by male artists. These notable Salon paintings include Adam and Eve (Adam et Eve) (1909), Joy of Life (La Joie de vivre) (1911), and Casting the Net (Lancement du filet) (1914). In her lifetime, Valadon produced approximately 273 drawings, 478 paintings, and 31 etchings, excluding pieces given away or destroyed.

Valadon was well known during her lifetime, especially toward the end of her career, in the 1920s more specifically, as she helped to transform the female nude that depicted expression through a woman's experience. . Her works are in the collection of the Centre Georges Pompidou in Paris, the Museum of Grenoble, and the Metropolitan Museum of Art in New York, among others.

Valadon's painting of an acrobat, L' Acrobate ou La Roue, sold in 2017 for £75,000 by Christie's Auction House.

Style

Valadon was not confined to a specific style, yet both Symbolist and Post-Impressionist aesthetics are clearly demonstrated within her work. She worked primarily with oil paint, oil pencils, pastels, and red chalk; she did not use ink or watercolor because these mediums were too fluid for her preference. Valadon's paintings feature rich colors and bold, open brushwork often featuring firm black lines to define and outline her figures.

Valadon's self-portraits, portraits, nudes, landscapes, and still lifes remain detached from trends and contemporaneous aspects of academic art. The subjects of Valadon's paintings often reinvent the old master themes: women bathing, reclining nudes, and interior scenes. She preferred to paint working-class models. Art historian Patricia Mathews suggests that Valadon's working-class status and experience as a model influenced her intimate, familiar observation of these women and their bodies. In this respect she differed from Berthe Morisot and Mary Cassatt, who painted mostly women, but "remained well within the bounds of propriety in their subject matter" because of their upper-middle-class status in French society. Valadon's marginalized status allowed her to enter the contemporary male dominated domain of art through modeling and her lack of formal academic training may have made her less influenced by academic conventions.  She has been noted for that difference in her paintings of the nude women. She resisted typical depictions of women, emphasizing class trappings and their sexual attractiveness, through her realistic depiction of unidealised and self-possessed women who are not overly sexualised. She also painted many nude self-portraits across the span of her career, the later of which displayed her aging body realistically.

Valadon emphasized the importance of the composition of her portraits over techniques such as painting expressive eyes. Her later works, such as Blue Room (1923), are brighter in color and show a new emphasis on decorative backgrounds and patterned materials.

Personal life
In 1883, aged 18, Valadon gave birth to a son, Maurice Utrillo. Valadon's mother cared for Maurice while she returned to modelling. Later, Valadon's friend Miquel Utrillo signed papers recognizing Maurice as his son, although the true paternity was never disclosed.

Satie became obsessed with her, calling her his , writing impassioned notes about "her whole being, lovely eyes, gentle hands, and tiny feet". After six months she left, leaving him devastated. 

Valadon married the stockbroker Paul Mousis in 1895. For 13 years, she lived with him in an apartment in Paris and in a house in the outlying region. In 1909, Valadon began an affair with the painter André Utter, a 23-year-old friend of her son. He became a model for her and appears as Adam in Adam et Eve, which was painted that year. She divorced Moussis in 1913. Valadon then married Utter in 1914. Utter managed her career as well as that of her son. Valadon and Utter regularly exhibited work together until the couple divorced in 1934, when Valadon was almost seventy. They continued a relationship until her death, nonetheless, and are buried together in the Saint Ouen cemetery in Paris.

Exhibitions

Group exhibitions
 1894, Société Nationale des Beaux-Arts, Paris 
 1907, Galerie Eugène Blot, Paris
 1909, Salon d'Automne, Grand Palais, Paris
 1910, Salon d'Automne, Grand Palais, Paris
 1911, Salon d'Automne, Grand Palais, Paris
 1911 - continuing, Salon des Indépendants, Paris
 1917, Utrillo, Valadon, Utter, Galerie Berthe Weill, Paris
 1920, Second Exhibition of Young French Painting, Galerie Manzy Joyant, Paris
 1921, Young Painting, Palais d'Ixelles
 1926, (retrospective), Salon des Indépendants, Paris
 1927, Salon des Tuileries, Paris
 1928, Salon des Tuileries, Paris
 1933-1938, Salon des Femmes Artistes Modernes, Paris
After her death in 1938
 1940, 22nd Biennale Internationale des Beaux-Arts, Paris
 1949, Great Trends in Contemporary Painting from Manet to our Day, Musée des Beaux-Arts, Lyons; 1961, Maurice Utrillo V. Suzanne Valadon, Haus der Kunst, Munich
 1964, Documenta, Kassel
 1969, Fourteenth Salon de Montrouge
 1976, Women Artists (1550-1950), Los Angeles County Museum of Art
 1979, Maurice Utrillo, Suzanne Valadon, Musée Toulouse-Lautrec
 1991, Albi: Utrillo, Valadon, Utter, Chateau Constant, Bessines 
 1991, Utrillo, Valadon, Utter: la Trilogie Maudite, Acropolis, Nice

Solo exhibitions 
 1911, the first solo exhibition of the work of Suzanne Valadon, at the Galerie Clovis Sagot
 1915, Galerie Berthe Weill, Paris
 1919, Galerie Berthe Weill, Paris
 1922, Galerie Bernheim-Jeune, Paris
 1923, Galerie Bernheim-Jeune, Paris
 1927, retrospective, Galerie Berthe Weill, Paris
 1928, Galerie des Archers, Lyons
 1928, Galerie Berthe Weill, Paris
 1929, Galerie Bernheim-Jeune, Paris
 1929, Galerie Bernier, Paris
 1931, Galerie Le Portique, Paris
 1931, Galerie Le Centaure, Brussels
 1932, Galerie Le Portique, Paris
 1932, retrospective with a preface by Édouard Herriot, Galerie Georges Petit, Paris
 1937, Galerie Bernier, Paris
 1938, Galerie Pétridès, Paris
 1939, Galerie Bernier, Paris
 1942, Galerie Pétridès, Paris
 1947, Galerie Bernier, Paris
 1947, Galerie Pétridès, Paris
 1948, Tribute to Suzanne Valadon, Musée National d'Art Moderne, Paris
 1956, The Lefevre Gallery, London
 1959, Galerie Pétridès, Paris
 1962, Galerie Pétridès, Paris
 1967, Musée National d'Art Moderne, Paris
 1996, Suzanne Valadon, Pierre Gianada Foundation, Martigny
 2021, Barnes Foundation, September 26, 2021 to January 9, 2022, first major U.S. solo exhibition of Valadon's work 
 2022, Glyptoteket, Copenhagen

Permanent collections 
  Albright-Knox, Buffalo
British Museum, London
Carnegie Museum of Art, Pittsburgh
 Dallas Museum of Art, Dallas
Detroit Institute of Arts
Fine Arts Museums of San Francisco
 Harvard Art Museums, Cambridge
Indianapolis Museum of Art
Metropolitan Museum of Art
 Minneapolis Institute of Art
 Musée d'Unterlinden, Colmar
Musée des beaux-arts de Lyon
 Museum of Fine Arts, Houston
Museum of Modern Art, New York
 National Museum of Women in the Arts
 Nelson-Atkins Museum of Art, Kansas City
Petit Palais, Geneva
Rose Art Museum, Waltham
Smart Museum of Art, Chicago
University of Michigan Museum of Art, Ann Arbor

Gallery

Artwork by Valadon

Portraits of Valadon

Illustrations 
 Jean Cocteau, Bertrand Guégan (1892-1943); L'almanach de Cocagne pour l'an 1920-1922, Dédié aux vrais Gourmands Et aux Francs Buveurs

Feminist commentary 
As one of the best documented French artists of the early twentieth century, Valadon's body of work has been of great interest to feminist art historians, especially given her focus on the female form. Her work was candid and occasionally awkward, often characterized by strong lines, and her resistance to both academic and avant-garde conventions for representing the female nude have encouraged interest in her work: It has been argued that many of her images of women signal a form of resistance to some of the dominant representations of female sexuality in early twentieth-century Western art. Many of her nudes painted from the 1910s onward are heavily proportioned and sometimes awkwardly posed. The feminist critics assert that they are conspicuously at odds with the svelte, 'feminine' type to be found in the imagery of both popular and 'high' art.  Her self-portrait from 1931, when she was 66, stands out as one of the early examples of a woman painter recording her own physical decline.

Like many other talented female artists, although she is known to have been an important modern artist, Valadon never had been given a solo exhibition by a U.S. art institution. Her first institutional solo exhibition in the U.S., at the Barnes Foundation in Philadelphia, was scheduled to open in September 2021.

Honors and legacy
Both an asteroid (6937 Valadon) and a crater on Venus are named in her honor.

The small square at the base of the Montmartre funicular in Paris is named Place Suzanne Valadon. At the top of the funicular, and less than 50 meters to its east, are the steps named rue Maurice Utrillo after her son the artist.

Depiction in novels and plays 
A novel based on the life of Suzanne Valadon was written by Elaine Todd Koren and was published in 2001, titled Suzanne: of Love and Art.  An earlier novel by Sarah Baylis, Utrillo's Mother, was published first in England and later in the United States. Timberlake Wertenbaker's play, The Line (2009), traces the relationship between Valadon and Degas. Valadon was the basis for the character Suzanne Rouvier in the novel The Razor's Edge by W. Somerset Maugham.

Death
Suzanne Valadon died of a stroke on 7 April 1938, at the age of 72, and was buried in Division 13 of the Cimetière de Saint-Ouen, Paris. Among those in attendance at the funeral were her friends and colleagues André Derain, Pablo Picasso, and Georges Braque.

See also
 Musée de Montmartre, established in the building in which Valadon had an apartment and studio.

References

Citations

Sources

Further reading

 Catalog accompanying exhibition at the Barnes Foundation.
 Reprinted in 2018 and 2017:

External links

 A concise biography of Valadon.
 A gallery of her depictions of cats.
 

 
1865 births
1938 deaths
19th-century French painters
19th-century French women artists
20th-century French painters
20th-century French women artists
French artists' models
French circus performers
French women painters
Members of the Ligue de la patrie française
Modern painters
People of Montmartre
Burials at Saint-Ouen Cemetery